Craspedocephalus malabaricus, (formerly Trimeresurus malabaricus) commonly known as Malabar pit viper, Malabar rock pit viper, or rock viper, is a venomous pit viper species endemic to the High-moderate elevations of  western ghats of southwestern India.Recently this species complex was splited to three different species, Craspedocephalus malabaricus (North of palghat gap), Craspedocephalus travancoricus(South of shengottai gap), Craspedocephalus anamallensis(south of palghat gap upto North of shengottai gap).

Description
The tail is prehensile.

The weakly keeled dorsal scales are arranged in 21 or 19 rows at midbody. Ventral scales in the males number 143-158 and in females 136-159. Anal scale entire. Subcaudals paired and numbering 50-63 in males, 44-54 in females. Internasals large and usually touching. There are 9 or 10 supralabials, the first completely separated from the nasal. There is a single row of scales between supralabials and elongate subocular. The temporal scales are smooth or obliquely keeled.

Many different colour morphs are known to exist, including colours such as yellow, green, and brown. Shown here is a brown colour morph with pattern.

Distribution and habitat
The species is endemic to Western Ghats mountains, occurring along the southern and western India at  elevation. The type locality is the Western Ghats of southwestern India. Records of this species are from Slient valley, western Nilgiris, Wayanad, Coorg, Malnad region of Karnataka, Castle Rock, Goa and northwards into Maharashtra in the Amboli hills. Kolhapur area. It inhabits riparian forests and is very partial to hill streams and torrents, situated within dense wet rainforests, sometimes also evergreen and deciduous forests, where it may be found on the ground, on rocks present in stream beds, on low vegetation, or in shrubs.

Ecology
The Malabar pit viper is nocturnal and usually inactive in the day, sometimes seen basking on rocks or trees near streams. It is more commonly encountered during the monsoon months. The species preys upon frogs, lizards, nestling birds, musk shrews, mice and other small animals.

Venom
C. malabaricus is slow-moving, but capable of fast strikes. Its venom causes moderate pain and swelling to humans. These symptoms subside in a day or two.

References

Further reading

Jerdon, T.C. 1854 ["1853"]. Catalogue of Reptiles inhabiting the Peninsula of India. Journ. Asiat. Soc. Bengal 22: 522-534.
Smith, M.A. 1943. The Fauna of British India, Ceylon and Burma, Including the Whole of the Indo-Chinese Sub-region. Reptilia and Amphibia. Vol. III.—Serpentes. Secretary of State for India. (Taylor and Francis, Printers.) London. xii + 583 pp. (Trimeresurus malabaricus, p. 513.) 

malabaricus
Reptiles described in 1854
Endemic fauna of the Western Ghats
Reptiles of India
Taxobox binomials not recognized by IUCN